Soyuz TMA-3 was a Soyuz (Russian Союз ТМА-3, Union TMA-3) mission to the International Space Station (ISS)  launched by a Soyuz FG launch vehicle which  was the third flight for the TMA modification of the Soyuz spacecraft, and the 7th Soyuz to fly to the ISS.

Crew

Original Crew

Mission parameters
From NASA:
Mass: ? kg
Perigee: 376 km
Apogee: 384 km
Inclination: 51.6°
Period: 92.20 min

Docking with ISS
Docked to ISS: October 20, 2003, 07:16 UTC (to Pirs module)
Undocked from ISS: April 29, 2004, 20:52 UTC (from Pirs module)

Specifications
Max. altitude - 387.1 km
Min. altitude - 357.9 km
Period - 91.7 min
Inclination - 65.64°

Mission highlights

The commander of the Soyuz was Aleksandr Kaleri (RKA). The flight engineer was Michael Foale (NASA), and Pedro Duque (ESA) served as the second flight engineer. After docking with the ISS they exchanged the current crew on ISS and became the eighth station crew, called "ISS Expedition Eight". During the stay on the station Michael Foale was the ISS Commander, while Aleksandr Kaleri was the engineer. Foale was the first American to have served on both Mir and the ISS. Pedro Duque performed some ESA sponsored science experiments under the mission name Cervantes and then returned with the ISS 7 crew on Soyuz TMA-2.

The backup crew was William McArthur, Valery Tokarev and André Kuipers.

Foale and Kaleri along with André Kuipers, the third seater from TMA-4 landed on April 29, 2004, near Arkalyk, Kazakhstan. A minor helium leak did not affect their mission.

References

External links

 RussianSpaceWeb.com: Soyuz TMA-3

Crewed Soyuz missions
Spacecraft launched in 2003
Spacecraft which reentered in 2004
Spacecraft launched by Soyuz-FG rockets
Fully civilian crewed orbital spaceflights